Lemke's hutia (Rhizoplagiodontia lemkei) is an extinct species of rodent in the subfamily Capromyinae. It is monotypic within the genus Rhizoplagiodontia. It was endemic to Hispaniola (the Dominican Republic and Haiti). Its natural habitat was subtropical or tropical moist lowland forests. It is thought to have gone extinct after European colonization of the islands.

References

Hutias
Extinct rodents
Mammals of Haiti
Mammals of the Dominican Republic
Mammals of the Caribbean
Extinct animals of the Dominican Republic
Extinct animals of Haiti
Holocene extinctions
Rodent extinctions since 1500
Mammals described in 1989
Taxonomy articles created by Polbot
Taxobox binomials not recognized by IUCN